Track of the Moon Beast is a 1976 horror film directed by Richard Ashe and written by Bill Finger and Charles Sinclair. The story revolves around a mineralogist being hit in the head by a meteor, which turns him in to a vicious reptilian creature during the full moon.

Plot

The film takes place in Albuquerque, New Mexico, where mineralogist Paul Carlson (Chase Cordell) is struck by a lunar meteorite while observing a meteor shower. Lodged in his brain, the meteorite causes him to transform into a strong and vicious lizard (the titular "moon beast") whenever the moon comes out. In his lizard form, Paul loses all traces of his human self and goes about killing people at random. While human, Paul is subject to spells of dizziness and nausea, causing his girlfriend Kathy Nolan (Donna Leigh Drake) and friend and former anthropology professor, Johnny "Longbow" Salinas (Gregorio Sala), to become concerned.

Eventually it is shown that Paul is the monster, and deduced that the meteorite fragment in his brain is the cause of his transformations. Plans are made to remove it from his skull, but the NASA brain surgeons realize, after another X-ray and Johnny remembering some Native American legends documenting similar phenomena, that the meteorite has disintegrated and will eventually cause Paul to self-combust. When Paul learns of this, he escapes into the desert on a motorcycle, presumably to kill himself so he will not cause any more harm. When Johnny recalls that Paul's favorite place was always Sandia Crest, Kathy, Johnny, and local law enforcement officers follow him there. Johnny shoots him with an arrow made of the original meteorite, which causes him to explode.

Cast

Production 
Track of the Moon Beast was produced by Ralph T. Desiderio and written by Bill Finger. It was filmed in locations around Albuquerque, New Mexico. Frank Larrabee and his band performed their song "California Lady" in the film after they were coerced by the filmmakers. The film crew and the band were both staying in the local Ramada Inn in Albuquerque where the performance footage was shot.

Reception and legacy 
Originally Filmed in 1972 [of which it bears the copyright date] It sat on the Shelf Waiting for a Theatrical Distributor to pick it up  for almost 4 years until Track of the Moon Beast was finally Released straight to Television on June 1, 1976.

Critical response has been predominantly negative. John Kenneth Muir considered it to be "a failure in every way", criticizing its special effects, acting, and story. Despite the negativity, Muir noted it had a quirky charm to it, seeing it as part of a line of other low-budget 1970s films such as The Crater Lake Monster and The Giant Spider Invasion.

TV Guide panned the film stating, "Although this premise is ripe with comedic opportunities, the production is hampered by classically inept film-making, and the story unfolds so slowly one begins to think the film is running in reverse. The acting is even worse. Still, horror fanatics might find some interest in Joe Blasko's lizard makeup".
Oh the Horror! gave the film a negative review calling it "embarrassing" and called the ending "ridiculous", panning the film's execution, dialogue, and script.

The film was featured in a Season 10 episode of Mystery Science Theater 3000. Fodder for mockery included, but was not limited to, the "brain-dead" expression of the lead actress, the "horrible" dialogue, and the suggestive name and unctuous nature of the character "Johnny Longbow", whom they repeatedly refer to as "Johnny Longbone".

The scene in which Johnny names ingredients in his stew quickly became a running gag and one of the writers' favorite moments from the series. Writer Kevin Murphy stated that his world-weary sigh of "onions..." made Johnny Longbow one of the "best" characters they've ever encountered.

Another popular part from the episode was when Mike Nelson had an entire host segment about The Band that Played California Lady, performed in the voiceover style of VH1's Behind the Music, which was about the made-up band featured in the film that played a song called "California Lady".

Home media 
Track of the Moon Beast was first released to DVD in 2001 by American Home Treasures on the DVD compilation Classic Creature Movies II (Creature / Track Of The Moon Beast / Snowbeast). It has since been released as part of several DVD compilations of public domain movies, including; Chilling Classics 50 movie pack by Mill Creek Entertainment in 2005, 50 Fright Classics by Emson in 2006 and Drive-in Classics by St. Clair Entertainment Group in 2007. It was also part of the 38th MST3K DVD set released on March 28, 2017.

See also
Redsploitation
List of films in the public domain
Stew

References

Bibliography

External links
 
 
 
 
 Excerpt

Mystery Science Theater 3000 
 Episode guide: 1007- Track of the Moon Beast
 MST3K treatment on ShoutFactoryTV
 Said episode also on IMDb

1976 films
1976 horror films
American science fiction horror films
American natural horror films
1970s monster movies
1970s science fiction horror films
Films about lizards
American monster movies
1970s English-language films
1970s American films